Christ Carrying the Cross is an oil on panel painting by Hieronymus Bosch. The date of this painting is c. 1505–1507. It is held resides at Palacio Real, in Madrid.

See also
Christ Carrying the Cross (Bosch, Vienna)
Christ Carrying the Cross (Bosch, Ghent)

External links
Christ Carrying the Cross at Web Gallery of Art

Paintings by Hieronymus Bosch
Bosch
Paintings in the Royal Palace of Madrid